Phoenix Banat Storm are an American soccer team, founded in 2006, who played in the National Premier Soccer League (NPSL), the fourth tier of the American Soccer Pyramid, for just one season. The team is named after the eastern part of the Banat region in present-day Romania and Serbia.

The Storm played their home matches at Friendship Park in Avondale, Arizona, 18 miles west of downtown Phoenix. The team's colors were red and white.

The club currently plays at an amateur level in a local league as Banat Arsenal.

Year-by-year

External links
 Banat Soccer Club

National Premier Soccer League teams
Soccer clubs in Arizona
Sports in Maricopa County, Arizona
2006 establishments in Arizona
Association football clubs established in 2006